Fiscal usually refers to government finance. In this context, it may refer to:

Economics
 Fiscal policy, use of government expenditure to influence economic development
 Fiscal policy debate
 Fiscal adjustment, a reduction in the government primary budget deficit
 Fiscal agent, a proxy that manages fiscal matters on behalf of another party
 Fiscal illusion, a public choice theory of government expenditure
 Fiscal space, the flexibility of a government in its spending choices
 Fiscal sponsorship, when non-profit organizations offer their legal and tax-exempt status to groups
 Fiscal sustainability, the ability of a government to sustain its current spending
 Fiscal transparency, publication of information on how governments manage public resources
 Fiscal year, reporting periods for firms and other agencies

Places
 Fiscal Parish, in Portugal
 Fiscal, Spain municipality in Huesca, Spain

Other
 Fiscal Studies, a quarterly peer-reviewed academic journal
 Fiscal cancel, a cancellation on a stamp
 Fiscal fine, a form of deferred prosecution agreement in Scotland
 Fiscal of Colombo, a predecessor to the Inspector General of Police
 Deputy Fiscal, an officer of a District Court, Small Claims Court or Magistrates’ Court in Sri Lanka
 Procurator fiscal, a public prosecutor in Scotland
 Fiscal flycatcher, a small passerine bird in the Old World flycatcher family
 Fiscal (bird), some African species of the shrike genus Lanius
 Fiscal metering in oil & gas, to mean custody transfer

See also
 Fiscal Responsibility Act (disambiguation)